Dmitry Vladimirovich Sukhotsky (born 16 May 1981) is a Russian professional boxer who has challenged twice for a light-heavyweight world title, in 2009 and 2014.

Professional career
Sukhotsky made his professional debut on 1 December 2005, stopping Andrey Simonov in one round. For the next four years, Sukhotsky remained undefeated while fighting at super-middleweight exclusively in Russia. On 19 December 2009, he travelled abroad for the first time to fight WBO light-heavyweight champion Jürgen Brähmer in his native Germany, but lost a clear unanimous decision (UD). He would stay at light-heavyweight for his next four successful outings, all in Russia, until a second UD loss to Cornelius White on 14 July 2012.

A second opportunity at a world title came on 19 December 2014, this time against WBC, Ring magazine and lineal light-heavyweight champion Adonis Stevenson. After four uncompetitive rounds, Sukhotsky was brutally knocked out in the fifth.

Professional boxing record

References

External links

1981 births
Living people
Russian male boxers
Super-middleweight boxers
Light-heavyweight boxers
People from Pavlovsk, Saint Petersburg
Sportspeople from Saint Petersburg